Leandro Miguel Curto Antunes (born 28 July 1997) is a Portuguese professional footballer who plays for S.C. Braga B as a forward.

Club career
On 6 August 2016, Antunes made his professional debut with Braga B in a 2016–17 LigaPro match against Fafe.

References

External links

Stats and profile at LPFP 

1997 births
Living people
Portuguese footballers
Association football forwards
Liga Portugal 2 players
S.C. Braga B players